The West Australian Netball League, also referred to as the WA Netball League, is a state netball league featuring teams from Western Australia. It is organised by Netball Western Australia. On a national level, the league is effectively a third level league, below Suncorp Super Netball and the Australian Netball League. It was originally known as the Gold Netball League. During the later 2000s and early 2010s, it was known as the Smarter than Smoking Netball League. Since 2019 it has been known as the Gold Industry Group WANL. Historically, the league's most successful team has been  
Southside Demons. During the 2010s the most successful team has been West Coast Warriors.

History

Early seasons
The league was launched in 1989 as the Gold Netball League. It originally featured just one division. A reserves division was added in 1990 and an under-18 division, was added in 2000. The inaugural premiers in 1989 were Coastal Raiders. During the early 1990s, Perth Superdrome Bullets were the dominant team, winning four titles in a row between 1991 and 1994 and then a fifth title in 1996.

Demons    
Historically, the WANL's most successful team are Demons. Founded in 1989 and originally based in Kenwick, Demons have played under various names. They won their first senior premiership in 1997 as KAE Sparks and a second in 2004 as Southside Sparks. In 2004 they became the first WANL team to win all three divisions. In 2006, after forming a partnership with Perth Football Club, they became South East Demons. Between 2007 and 2010, as Midland Brick Demons, they completed a four-in-a-row of senior premierships. As South East Demons they won a seventh and eight premiership in 2013 and 2014 respectively. In 2018 they adopted their current name, Southside Demons. Notable Demons players included Australia internationals, Caitlin Bassett and Courtney Bruce, and Jill McIntosh Medal winner, Lindal Rohde.

West Coast Warriors
During the 2010s the most successful WANL team has been West Coast Warriors. Like Demons, Warriors have also played under several names. They originally played as West Coast Warriors. They later became Wanneroo Warriors, Compact Warriors, West Coast Falcons and, in 2014, back to West Coast Warriors. They won their first senior premiership in 1998.  With a team coached by England international, Ama Agbeze and featuring Alicia Janz, they won their second premiership in 2012 as West Coast Falcons. They has since won further premierships in 2016, 2017 and 2019. Other notable Warriers players include two time Jill McIntosh Medal winner, Andrea Gilmore.

Men's division
Between 2001 and 2004 the WANL featured a men's netball division. Bullets were the inaugural premiers. Coastals won the other three titles.  The Men's Division was relaunched in 2018 featuring four teams – West Coast Warriors, Perth Lions, South East Demons and Wheatbelt Flames. West Coast Warriors would go on to win the first two titles.

Representative team
Western Sting who play in the Australian Netball League are effectively the representative team of the West Australian Netball League.

Teams

2020 teams
The 2020 season featured eight teams who enter teams in both the Open Division and the Under-20 Division. Four of the teams – Comets, Demons, Warriors and Roar – also enter teams in the Men's Division.

Notes
  Curtin Hamersley Comets is a partnership between Curtin University and Hamersley Netball Club. 
  East Freo Sharks are effectively the successor team of Coastal Sharks. They are a partnership between the Fremantle Netball Association and East Fremantle Football Club.
  Peel Lightning is the representative team of the Peel Football Netball League.  
  Southside Demons previously played as KAE Sparks, Southside Sparks, Midland Brick Demons and South East Demons
  Souwest Jets are affiliated with Edith Cowan University .
  West Coast Warriors previously played as Wanneroo Warriors, Compact Warriors, West Coast Falcons.

Senior grand finals

Notable players

Internationals

 Kate Beveridge
 Caitlin Bassett
 Courtney Bruce
 Susan Fuhrmann

 Ama Agbeze

West Coast Fever

ANL MVP

Jill McIntosh Medal
The Jill McIntosh Medal is awarded annually to the WANL's Best and fairest player.  Between 1989 and 1990 it was called the Classique Player of the Series and between  1991 and 1993 it was called the Berri Medal.

Sponsorship

References

 
Netball in Western Australia
Western Australia
Western Sting
Netball
1989 establishments in Australia
Sports leagues established in 1989